Edward Sheffield Bartholomew (1822 - May 2, 1858) was a noted American sculptor active in Italy.

Bartholomew was born in Colchester, Connecticut. After apprenticeships as a bookbinder and dentist, his first employment was as a dentist in Hartford, but he soon abandoned it for painting and (after learning that he was color-blind) sculpture. In 1844 he studied at the National Academy of Design's antique class in New York City, from 1845-1848 directed the Wadsworth Atheneum in Hartford, contracting a severe case of smallpox circa 1847, then studied for another year in the National Academy of Design and sailed for Europe. From 1851 onwards he lived in Rome and died in Naples of bronchitis.

Bartholomew is known for his bas reliefs, marble busts and statues, and medallions in the neo-classical style. His earliest recorded work is a medallion of poet Lydia Sigourney (1847). Among his best-known works are Blind Homer Led by the Genius of Poetry (1851, now in the Metropolitan Museum), Eve, Campagna Shepherd Boy (Peabody Institute), Genius of Painting, Youth and Old Age, Evening Star, Eve Repentant (Wadsworth Atheneum), Washington and Flora, A Monument to Charles Carroll (near Baltimore), Bellsarius at the Porta Pincinia, and Ganymede. Many of his works are now held by the Wadsworth Atheneum.

References 

 Appleton's Cyclopedia of American Biography, edited by James Grant Wilson and John Fiske, New York: D. Appleton and Company, 1887–1889
 David Bernard Dearinger, Paintings and Sculpture in the Collection of the National Academy of Design, Vol. 1 : 1826-1926, Hudson Hills, 2004, page 27. .
 Susan Underwood Crane, "Edward Sheffield Bartholomew", Connecticut Quarterly, v. 2, July–September 1896, pages 202-214.
 William G. Wendell, "Edward Sheffield Bartholomew", Wadsworth Atheneum Bulletin, 5th series, Winter 1962, pages 1–18.
 AskArt entry
 Metropolitan Museum: Blind Homer Led by the Genius of Poetry

1822 births
1858 deaths
People from Colchester, Connecticut
19th-century American sculptors
American male sculptors
Artists from Hartford, Connecticut
American expatriates in Italy
Sculptors from Connecticut
19th-century American male artists
Deaths from bronchitis